The 2003 Cork Junior A Hurling Championship was the 106th staging of the Cork Junior A Hurling Championship since its establishment by the Cork County Board in 1895. The championship began on 21 September 2003 and ended on 16 November 2003.

On 16 November 2003, Dromina won the championship following a 2-13 to 0-9 defeat of Argideen Rangers in the final. This was their first championship title in the grade.

Dromina's Martin Finn was the championship's top scorer with 1-23.

Qualification

Results

First round

Semi-finals

Final

Championship statistics

Top scorers

Overall

In a single game

References

Cork Junior Hurling Championship
Cork Junior Hurling Championship